Rita Connolly is the first solo recording by Rita Connolly. It features guest appearances by Davy Spillane, Liam O'Flynn, The Voice Squad, Máirtín O'Connor, Palle Mikkelborg, Ray Lynam, amidst others. The album includes a number of Connolly's own compositions.

Track listing
"Venezuela" – 4:49 (Traditional; arranged by R Connolly/S Davey)
"Miracles" – 4:21 (Shaun Davey)
"Factory Girl / Same Old Man" – 4:21 (Traditional; arranged by R Connolly/S Davey)
"Stormy Weather" – 4:35 (Harold Arlen, Ted Koehler)
"Alice in Jericho" – 4:26 (Thom Moore)
"Fanny Hawke" – 3:41 (Words: Sebastian Barry–Music: Shaun Davey)
"It's Really Pouring" – 4:45 (Rita Connolly)
"Two of Us" – 4:14 (Lennon–McCartney Northern Songs)
"Amiens" – 3:01 (Shaun Davey)
"Red Dust" – 5:31 (Rita Connolly)
"Dreams in the Morning" – 6:02 (Shaun Davey)
"Close Your Eyes" – 3:31 (Rita Connolly)

Personnel
 Rita Connolly - Vocals
 Shaun Davey - Keyboards, vocals.
 Davy Spillane - Low whistle
 Palle Mikkelborg - Trumpet, Flugelhorn
 Helen Davies - Harp
 Máirtín O'Connor - Button Accordion
 Liam O'Flynn - Uilleann pipes
 Ray Lynam - Vocals
 The Voice Squad - Vocals
 The Wind Machine - Brass
 Paul Mc Ateer / Paul Moran, Drums
 Eoghan O'Neill / John Drummond / Tony Molloy - Bass
 Des Moore / Greg Boland / Gerry O'Beirne / Philip Donnelly / Anthony Drennan - Guitars
 James Delaney - Keyboards
 Jack Bayle / Sean Fleming -Trombone
 William Dowdal - Flute
 Inez Connolly / Ursula Connolly / Peter Connolly - Vocals
 Members Of The National Philharmonic Choir.

Production
 Produced by : Shaun Davey & Rita Connolly.
 Engineered & Mixed by : Bill Somerville Large.
 Additional Engineering : John Grimes, Brian Masterson.
 Engineering Assistants : Sarah McCann, Lorcan Roche, Stephen Rushe.
 Recorded at : Westland Studios, Dublin and Windmill Lane Studios, Dublin.

References

External links
 Album sleevenotes
 Record Label Catalogue 2010

1992 albums
Rita Connolly albums